Robert M. Hahn (August 25, 1925 – July 28, 2009) was a professional basketball player who spent one season in the National Basketball Association as a member of the Chicago Stags during the 1949–50 season. He attended North Carolina State University.

N.C. State basketball's 6'10" Center, #82 Bob Hahn of Ann Arbor, Michigan

The Harlem Globetrotters (1951)… Thomas Gomez, Dorothy Dandridge, Bill Walker, Angela Clarke.  Young Bill Townsend drops out of college to join the famous independent Trotter team. He also finds romance along the way. "Goose" Tatum and fancy dribbler Marcus Haynes were the star players of the Globetrotters at the time and Abe Saperstein was the owner. Tatum, Haynes, Babe Presley, Ermer Robinson, Duke Cumberland, Clarence Wilson, Pop Gates, Frank Washington, Ted Strong and other current team members appear in the film as themselves. Also featured is a lot of actual game footage (three times against the Celtics with Tony Lavelli and Big Bob Hahn) including their famous "Sweet Georgia Brown" warm-up routine. [Along with making the film, the team toured Major League Baseball stadiums that year and went on their first tour of South America.]

Career
Ann Arbor High School - Michigan (High School)
1946-47 North Carolina State University (College) 
1948-49 North Carolina State University (College)
1949-50 Chicago Stags (NBA)
1950-51 United States Stars (Independent)  - Official opponents for Harlem Globetrotters tour 

Born to Gustave and Elfreda Hahn, Hahn attended Ann Arbor HS before heading off to NC State. He missed his sophomore year due to academic reasons, but the 6'10 senior returned for the 1948-49 seasons. He left NC State and played in for the Chicago Stags in the NBA. After his short stint with the Stags, he toured with the Globetrotters in Europe and Africa. He then returned to Ann Arbor and worked for many years at Sears.

He married Joline Howard in 1951.  They had one son, Michael Hahn, and 4 grandchildren.  He died in July 2009.

External links

1925 births
2009 deaths
Basketball players from Ann Arbor, Michigan
Centers (basketball)
Chicago Stags players
NC State Wolfpack men's basketball players
Undrafted National Basketball Association players